FC Flora U19 Tallinn, commonly known as Flora U19 Tallinn, or simply as Flora U19, is a football club, based in Tallinn, Estonia.

Founded as FC Flora III, it is the reserve team of Flora U21, and currently plays in the II Liiga.

Reserve teams in Estonia play in the same league system as the senior team, rather than in a reserve team league. They must play at least one level below their main side, however, so Flora U19 is ineligible for promotion to the Esiliiga but can play in the Estonian Cup.

Players

Current squad
 ''As of 22 March 2016.

Personnel

Current technical staff

Managerial history

References

External links
Official website
Team info at Estonian Football Association

FC Flora
Flora U19